This is a list of 19th-century Russian painters.

Abram Arkhipov 1862–1930
Ivan Aivazovsky 1817–1900
Nikolai Bogdanov-Belsky 1868–1945
Alexander Golovin 1863–1930
Pavel Fedotov 1815–1852
Nikolai Ge 1831–1894
Alexander Ivanov 1806–1858
Vasily Kamensky 1866–1944
Nikolai Kasatkin 1859–1930
Orest Kiprensky, 1782–1836
Konstantin Korovin 1861–1939
Alexei Korzukhin 1835–1894
Nikolay Koshelev 1840–1918
Evgraf Fedorovich Krendovsky 1810–1870
Eugene Lanceray 1875–1946
Klavdiy Lebedev 1852–1916
Mikhail Lebedev 1811–1837
Anton Legashov 1798–1865
Dmitry Levitsky 1735–1822
Konstantin Makovsky 1839–1915
Nikolay Makovsky 1841–1886
Vladimir Makovsky 1846–1920
Vassily Maximov 1844–1911
Grigoriy Myasoyedov 1834–1911
Mikhail Nesterov 1862–1942
Nikolai Nevrev 1830–1904
Ilya Ostroukhov 1858–1929
Vasily Perov 1834–1882
Vasily Polenov 1844–1927
Yelena Polenova 1850–1898 
Illarion Pryanishnikov 1840–1894
Vasili Pukirev 1832–1890
Ilya Repin 1844–1930
Fyodor Rokotov 1736–1808
Andrei Ryabushkin 1861–1904
Konstantin Savitsky 1844–1905 
Alexei Savrasov 1830–1897
Valentin Serov 1865–1911
Silvestr Schchedrin 1791–1830
Semion Shchedrin 1745–1804
Ivan Shishkin 1832–1898
Ivan Tarkhanov 1780–1848
Fyodor Tolstoy 1783–1873
Vasily Tropinin 1776–1856
Fyodor Vasilyev 1850–1873
Apollinary Vasnetsov 1856–1933
Viktor Vasnetsov 1848–1926
Vasily Vereshchagin 1842–1904
Konstantin Yuon 1875–1958
Nikolai Zagorsky 1849–1893

See also 
 List of 20th-century Russian painters
 List of Russian artists

 
Lists of 19th-century people
19th century in the Russian Empire
19th-century